Cardinal Albert of Brandenburg (28 June 149024 September 1545) was a German cardinal, elector, Archbishop of Mainz from 1514 to 1545, and Archbishop of Magdeburg from 1513 to 1545.

Biography

Early career 

Born in Cölln on the Spree, Albert was the younger son of John Cicero, Elector of Brandenburg and Margaret of Thuringia.

After their father's funeral, Albert and his older brother Joachim I Nestor became margraves of Brandenburg in 1499, but only his older brother held the title of an elector of Brandenburg. Albert studied at the university of Frankfurt (Oder), and in 1513 became Archbishop of Magdeburg at the age of 23 and administrator of the Diocese of Halberstadt.

In 1514, he obtained the Electorate of Mainz, and in 1518, at the age of 28, was made a cardinal. The indulgence issued by Leo X in 1514 for the building of the new St. Peter's in Rome was entrusted to Albert (1517) for publication in Saxony and Brandenburg. It cost him the considerable sum of ten thousand ducats, and Albert employed Johann Tetzel for the actual preaching of the indulgence. Later, Martin Luther addressed a letter of protest to Albert concerning the conduct of Tetzel.

Largely in reaction to Tetzel's actions, Luther wrote his famous Ninety-five Theses, which led to the Reformation. Luther sent these to Albert on 31 October 1517, and according to a disputable tradition, nailed a copy to the door of Castle Church in Wittenberg. Albert forwarded the theses to Rome, suspecting Luther of heresy. When the imperial election of 1519 drew near, partisans of the two leading candidates (King Charles I of Spain and Francis I of France) eagerly solicited the vote of the Prince-Archbishop of Mainz, and Albert appears to have received a large amount of money for his vote. The electors eventually chose Charles, who became the Emperor Charles V.

Albert's large and liberal ideas, his friendship with Ulrich von Hutten, and his political ambitions, appear to have raised hopes that he could be won over to Protestantism; but after the German Peasants' War of 1525 he ranged himself definitely among the supporters of Catholicism, and was among the princes who joined the League of Dessau in July 1525.

Albert needed a prestigious church building that met his expectations at a central location in his residenz town. Albert feared for his peace of mind in heaven, and collected more than 8,100 relics and 42 holy skeletons which needed to be stored. These precious treasures, known as "Hallesches Heilthum", indirectly related to the sale of indulgences which had triggered the Reformation a few years before. Then, the cardinal and the Catholic members of the town council wanted to repress the growing influence of the Reformation by holding far grander masses and services in a new church dedicated solely to the Blessed Virgin Mary.

Albert's hostility towards the reformers, however, was not so extreme as that of his brother Joachim I; and he appears to have exerted himself towards peace, although he was a member of the League of Nuremberg, formed in 1538 as a counterpoise to the League of Schmalkalden. New doctrines nevertheless made considerable progress in his dominions, and he was compelled to grant religious liberty to the inhabitants of Magdeburg in return for 500,000 florins. During his later years showed more intolerance towards the Protestants, and favoured the teaching of the Jesuits in his dominions.

Market Church of Our Lady
The Market Church of Our Lady in Halle, which had been built to defend against the spread of Reformation sympathies, was the spot where Justus Jonas officially introduced the Reformation into Halle with his Good Friday sermon in 1541. The service must have been at least partly conducted in the open air, because at that time construction had only been finished at the eastern end of the nave. Jonas began a successful preaching crusade and attracted so many people that the church overflowed. Albert left the town permanently after the estates in the city had announced that they would take over his enormous debt at the bank of Jakob Fugger. Halle became Protestant and in 1542 Jonas was appointed as priest to St. Mary's and, in 1544, bishop over the city.

Albert adorned the collegiate church at Halle and the cathedral at Mainz in sumptuous fashion, and took as his motto the words  (Latin for: "Lord, I admired the adornment of your house."). A generous patron of art and learning, he counted Erasmus among his friends.

Death
Albert died at the Martinsburg, Mainz in 1545.

Ancestry

References

Sources
 Helmut Börsch-Supan, et al. "Hohenzollern, House of." Grove Art Online. Oxford Art Online. Oxford University Press. Web. 24 Jul. 2016.
 Roesgen, Manfred von. Kardinal Albrecht von Brandenburg : ein Renaissancefürst auf dem Mainzer Bischofsthron. Moers : Steiger, 1980.
 Schauerte, Thomas and Andreas Tacke. Der Kardinal Albrecht von Brandenburg : Renaissancefürst und Mäzen. 2 v. Regensburg : Schnell + Steiner, 2006. Contents: Bd. 1. Katalog / herausgegeben von Thomas Schauerte—Bd. 2. Essays / herausgegeben von Andreas Tacke ; mit Beiträgen von Bodo Brinkmann ... [et al.]. Note: Exhibition held September 9November 26, 2006, Halle an der Saale.
 "Prayer Book of Cardinal Albrecht of Brandenburg." The J. Paul Getty Museum, viewed 24 July 2016.

External links
 

 

1490 births
1545 deaths
Clergy from Berlin
16th-century German cardinals
Archbishop-Electors of Mainz
Archbishops of Magdeburg
Roman Catholic Prince-Bishops of Halberstadt
Simony
Sons of monarchs